Classic is the second album by American hip hop recording artist Rah Digga. It is her first released since her 2000 debut album Dirty Harriet.

A buzz single entitled "Warning Shots" was released for promotion while "This Ain't No Lil' Kid Rap" was released as the sole single.  The album was released through Raw Koncept on September 14, 2010.

Track listing
All songs are produced by Nottz.

Personnel
Rashia Tashan Fisher - writer, performer, executive producer
Dominick J. Lamb - writer, producer, co-executive producer, mixing, recording
Darryl Sloan - co-executive producer, mixing, recording
William 'Bop' Faison - additional mixing & recording
Tim Clark - mastering
Mustafa Malik Shabazz - art direction & design
Lucas Zimmer - A&R

Charts

References

External links
Rah Digga Talks Comeback LP, Working With Nottz at XXL (magazine)

2010 albums
Rah Digga albums